Ryan Joseph Trevitt (born 12 March 2003) is an English professional footballer who plays as a midfielder for  club Brentford. He is a product of Leatherhead Youth and transferred to Brentford in 2021.

Club career

Brentford 
After playing for Leatherhead Youth between U6 and U18 level and trialling with Fulham and Queens Park Rangers, Trevitt joined the B team at Brentford club on trial in late 2020. On 11 January 2021, he signed an 18-month contract, with a one-year option, as a free agent. During the 2021–22 season, Trevitt trained with the first team, appeared in first team friendlies and was a part of the B team's London Senior Cup-winning squad. The option on his contract was exercised in May 2022. In July 2022, he signed a new two-year contract, with a one-year option.

Trevitt was called into the first team's 2022–23 pre-season and mid-season training camps. On 23 August 2022, Trevitt received his maiden call into a first team matchday squad for an EFL Cup second round match versus Colchester United and made his senior debut as a substitute for Halil Dervişoğlu after 72 minutes of the 2–0 victory.

Representative career 
Trevitt represented the ISFA South team at U17 level and England Futsal at U19 level.

Personal life 
Trevitt attended St John's School, Leatherhead.

Career statistics

Honours 
Brentford B

 London Senior Cup: 2021–22

References

External links

Ryan Trevitt at brentfordfc.com

Living people
English footballers
Brentford F.C. players
2003 births
Association football midfielders
People educated at St John's School, Leatherhead
English men's futsal players